Geert Dejonghe (born 21 October 1965) is a Belgian short track speed skater. He competed in the men's 5000 metre relay event at the 1992 Winter Olympics.

References

1965 births
Living people
Belgian male short track speed skaters
Olympic short track speed skaters of Belgium
Short track speed skaters at the 1992 Winter Olympics
Sportspeople from Ghent